Multimerin 1, also known as elastin microfibril interfacer 4 (EMILIN-4), is a protein that, in humans, is encoded by the MMRN1 gene.

Multimerin is a massive, soluble protein found in platelets and in the endothelium of blood vessels. It is composed of subunits linked by interchain disulfide bonds to form large, variably sized homomultimers. Multimerin is a factor V/Va-binding protein and may function as a carrier protein for platelet factor V.  It may also have functions as an extracellular matrix or adhesive protein. Recently, patients with an unusual autosomal-dominant bleeding disorder (factor V Quebec/Quebec Platelet Disorder) were found to have a deficiency of platelet multimerin.

References

Further reading

Glycoproteins